
Lake Sempach (German: Sempachersee) is a lake in the canton of Lucerne, Switzerland.

A  island named Gamma Insel is located east of Sursee.

In the 17th century the lake counted with five ferries, that brought goods to the weekly market in Sursee.

Many inhabitants of local areas swim, boat, paddle, and fish in Lake Sempach, due to its ease of accessibility.

References

External links

Sempachersee 
http://www.sempachersee.ch  Information about the municipalities on the lake
Waterlevels Lake Sempach at Sempach

Lakes of Switzerland
Lakes of the canton of Lucerne
LSempach